Amanecer is a 2009 short film written and directed by Alvaro D. Ruiz, produced by Ulysses Oliver and Luci Temple of Marshmallow Productions.  It is a Spanish-language drama set in Sydney, Australia.

Amanecer was one of four projects competitively selected for the 2008 Multicultural Mentorship Scheme, a Metro Screen and NSWFTO joint initiative.  Australian actor and producer Claudia Karvan was the project’s mentor.

Synopsis 
A young South American man struggles to build a new life for his wife and children in Australia. But, in this foreign land, his education and experience doesn’t seem to count. Dreams turn to lies. Lies become reality. Does he have the will to see the light of Amanecer?

Cast 
Matias Stevens – Juan
Jessica Chapnik – Andrea
Avital Greenberg-Teplitsky  - Mariana

Accolades 
Awards
 Best Actor - Colourfest Film Festival, 2011.
 Best Editing - El Espejo Film Festival, 2010.
 Local Filmmaker Award for Best Short Film - Sydney Latin American Film Festival, 2009.

Festivals – Official Selection
Colourfest Film Festival, 2011.
Santafé de Antioquia Film Festival, 2010.
Cortópolis Film Festival, 2010.
Colombian Cinema Showcase, 2010.
El Espejo Film Festival, 2010.
International Short Film Week, 2010.
 Dungog Film Festival, 2009.
 Sydney Latin American Film Festival, 2009.
 Bogotá Film Festival, 2009.
 Villa de Leyva International Film Festival, 2009.
 Los Angeles Latino International Film Festival, 2009.
 Adelaide Shorts Film Festival, 2009.
 Havana Film Festival, 2009.

References

External links 

 
 
 Amanecer website at Puracé Pictures
 Amanecer review at Arts Beat LA
 Amanecer in Screen Junkies' list of ten great independent short films from the 2000s

2009 films
Colombian short films
2009 short films
2000s Spanish-language films
Australian independent films
Australian drama short films
Colombian independent films
2009 drama films
Colombian drama films
2009 independent films